A tattoo is a marking made by the insertion of indelible ink into the skin.

Tattoo may also refer to:

Print media
Tattoo (comics), fictional mutant character in the Marvel Comics Universe
"Tattoo" (poem), a poem from Wallace Stevens' first book of poetry, Harmonium
"Tattoo" (short story), a 1996 short story by Matthew Condon

Film and TV

Film
 Tattoo (1967 film), a 1967 West German film directed by Johannes Schaaf
 Tattoo (1981 film), a 1981 American thriller directed by Bob Brooks, starring Bruce Dern
 Tattoo (2002 film), a 2002 German film directed by Robert Schwentke
 Tattoo, a 2011 short film directed by Bill Paxton
 Tattoo (2014 film), a 2014 Italian short film

Television
Tattoo (character), portrayed by Hervé Villechaize on the TV series Fantasy Island
Tattoo (Prison Break), the elaborate tattoo detailing the escape plan, which belongs to the protagonist of television series, Prison Break
"Tattoo" (Star Trek: Voyager), the 24th episode of Star Trek: Voyager
The tattoo (Haven), a recurring symbol in the TV series Haven

Music

Albums
Tattoo (David Allan Coe album), 1977
Tattoo (Rory Gallagher album), 1973
Tattoos (album), by Jason Derulo, 2013

Songs
"Tattoo" (The Who song), 1967
"Tattoo" (Big Mother Thruster song), 2001
"Tattoo" (Jordin Sparks song), 2007
"Tattoo" (Loreen song), 2023
"Tattoo" (Mike Oldfield instrumental), 1992
"Tattoo" (Van Halen song), 2012
"Tattoo" (Hunter Hayes song), 2014
"Tattoo" (Siouxsie and the Banshees song), 1983
"Tattoo", a 1989 song by Faster Pussycat from the album Wake Me When It's Over
"Tattoo", a 1995 song by Gang of Four from the album Shrinkwrapped
"Tattoo", a 1993 song by Janis Ian from the album Breaking Silence
"Tattoo", a 2011 song by Taio Cruz from his album TY.O
"Tattoos", a 2015 song by Caravan Palace from the album <|°_°|>
"Tattoo", a 2019 song by Rammstein from their untitled album

Military
Tattoo (bugle call)
Military tattoo, military drum performance or display
Heartland International Tattoo, an indoor arena performance in Hoffman Estates, Illinois
Royal Edinburgh Military Tattoo, a series of military tattoos held every August in Edinburgh, Scotland
Royal International Air Tattoo, a British airshow
Royal Nova Scotia International Tattoo, a large indoor show in Halifax Regional Municipality, Nova Scotia
Virginia International Tattoo, an annual exhibition held in Norfolk, Virginia
HMS Tattoo (J374), minesweeper
HMAS Tattoo, S-class destroyer

Technology
HTC Tattoo, a phone manufactured by HTC Corporation
Tattoo, locomotive design of Kerr, Stuart and Company
Globe Tattoo, a mobile broadband brand by Globe Telecom as a competitor to Smart Bro

Other uses
Tattoo, rum product by Captain Morgan
Tattoo, an archaic name for the Indian Country-bred pony